Kevin Curtis Kennedy (born May 26, 1954) is a former manager in American Major League Baseball and a former television host for Fox Sports' baseball coverage. He was given the nickname "The Skipper" by Fox Sports due to his prior managerial career. Kennedy joined the Tampa Bay Rays broadcast team for the 2009 baseball season as a replacement for Joe Magrane.

Biography

Early life and career
Born in Los Angeles, Kevin Kennedy graduated from Taft High School in Woodland Hills, California in 1972, where he was a classmate of Robin Yount.

He attended San Diego State University and was drafted by the Baltimore Orioles in the 8th round of the 1976 Major League Baseball Draft.

Kennedy was a career minor league catcher who played in the Orioles, St. Louis Cardinals and Los Angeles Dodgers farm systems. In 510 career games, he hit .238 with 12 homers and 178 RBI. While with the Pawtucket Red Sox in 1981, he was the only player from either team to not play in the longest professional baseball game of all time versus the Rochester Red Wings.

He retired from playing after the 1983 season and became a manager in the Dodgers farm system for the Great Falls Dodgers (1984–1986), Bakersfield Dodgers (1987), San Antonio Missions (1988) and Albuquerque Dukes (1989–1991).

He was subsequently the bench coach for the Montreal Expos during the 1992 season.

Managerial career

Texas Rangers
He then was hired to manage the Texas Rangers for the 1993 season after the firing of Bobby Valentine and Toby Harrah. Kennedy was let go following the strike-shortened 1994 season after posting only a 52–62 record (even though, at the time of the strike, it was good enough for first place in the division) and was replaced by Johnny Oates.

Boston Red Sox
For the 1995 season, Kennedy became the manager for the Boston Red Sox. He led them to their first postseason appearance since 1990, but they were swept by the Cleveland Indians in the playoffs. Kennedy was fired following the 1996 season after going from a .597 to a .525 winning percentage.

Managerial record

Broadcasting career
In 1997 Kennedy joined ESPN as a color analyst on the network's Wednesday Night Baseball telecasts, performing the same role on ESPN Radio's Sunday Night Baseball in 1998 and on Fox Sports Net's Thursday Night Baseball in 1999 and 2000. From 2001 to 2008, he was a studio analyst for baseball on Fox, teaming with host Jeanne Zelasko. He also contributed to Fox Sports Net's Best Damn Sports Show Period and hosted a radio program on FOX Sports Radio, and was a regular co-host of Dodgers Live on Prime Ticket at this time.

In 2009 Kennedy took a job as a part-time television analyst for the Tampa Bay Rays, sharing the duty with former Rays pitcher Brian Anderson. Kennedy and Anderson both replaced Joe Magrane, who is now a part of the MLB Network. Kennedy returned to the Dodgers' postgame show for the 2009 postseason.

In October 2010 it was announced that Kennedy would not be returning to the Rays' broadcast crew in the 2011 season.

Kevin co-hosted Power Alley with Jim Duquette on Sirius XM's MLB Network Radio on Sirius 209/XM 89 from 10 am – 2 pm EST in 2011.

From 2014 through 2018, Kennedy teamed with Rick Monday to call select games on the Dodgers Radio Network and occasionally co-hosted the team's Dodger Talk radio post-game show.

Other media 
In October 2019, Kennedy started doing podcasts of The Kevin Kennedy Show with Rich Grisham of Out of the Park Baseball and launched an official website where he teaches baseball instruction videos, has a blog, and hosts Q&A with fans.

References

External links

 Baseball-Reference.com – managerial record

1954 births
Living people
Albuquerque Dukes players
American sports radio personalities
Baseball coaches from California
Baseball players from Los Angeles
Bluefield Orioles players
Boston Red Sox managers
Charlotte O's players
ESPN Radio
Los Angeles Dodgers announcers
Louisville Redbirds players
Major League Baseball broadcasters
Major League Baseball bench coaches
Montreal Expos coaches
Rochester Red Wings players
San Antonio Missions managers
Springfield Redbirds players
Tampa Bay Rays announcers
Texas Rangers managers
William Howard Taft Charter High School alumni